Over the Hills and Everywhere is the second Christmas EP album by Seabird.  The EP was released on October 15, 2010.

Track listing
"Angels We Have Heard On High" (2:53)
"Go Tell It On The Mountain" (2:55)
"What Child Is This?" (3:08)
"Hark! The Herald Angels Sing" (3:31)
"O Come, O Come Emmanuel" (3:40)
"Joy to the World" (4:18)
"Silent Night" (3:50)

References

https://www.amazon.com/Over-The-Hills-And-Everywhere/dp/B0045GFD34/ref=ntt_mus_ep_dpi_3

2010 EPs
Seabird (band) albums
Christmas EPs
2010 Christmas albums
Christmas albums by American artists
Alternative rock Christmas albums